Saccharopolyspora tripterygii is a bacterium from the genus Saccharopolyspora which has been isolated from the stem of the plant Tripterygium hypoglaucum in Yunnan in China.

References

 

Pseudonocardineae
Bacteria described in 2009